The SBS Entertainment Awards is an awards ceremony held yearly, sponsored by Seoul Broadcasting System (SBS). The awards ceremony is approximately 140 minutes long and is shown in two parts on SBS. This event is held at the end of each year, and awards are given to the best entertainers for variety programs aired on its network. Since 2014, it is part of the SBS Awards Festival, along with SBS Gayo Daejeon and SBS Drama Awards. Since 2017, SAF Entertainment Award had been renamed back to SBS Entertainment Award.

History of winners

Grand Prize Award (Daesang)

2007 Awards

2008 Awards

2009 Awards

2010 Awards

2011 Awards

2012 Awards

2013 Awards

2014 Awards

2015 Awards

2016 Awards

2017 Awards

2018 Awards

2019 Awards

2020 Awards

2021 Awards

2022 Awards

Hosts

Ratings

See also 

 List of Asian television awards

References

External links

2007 SBS Entertainment Awards 
2008 SBS Entertainment Awards 
2009 SBS Entertainment Awards 
2010 SBS Entertainment Awards 
2011 SBS Entertainment Awards 
2012 SBS Entertainment Awards 
2013 SBS Entertainment Awards 
2014 SBS Entertainment Awards 
2015 SBS Entertainment Awards 
2016 SBS Entertainment Awards
2017 SBS Entertainment Awards 
2018 SBS Entertainment Awards 
2019 SBS Entertainment Awards 
2020 SBS Entertainment Awards 
2021 SBS Entertainment Awards  
2022 SBS Entertainment Awards  (Current)

Entertainment Awards
South Korean television awards
Awards established in 2007
2007 establishments in South Korea
Annual events in South Korea
South Korea annual television specials